Living Computers: Museum + Labs (LCM+L) is a computer and technology museum located in the SoDo neighborhood of Seattle, Washington. LCM+L showcases vintage computers which provide interactive sessions, either through time-sharing operating systems or single-user interfaces. This gives users a chance to actually use the computers online or in-person in the museum. An expansion adds direct touch experiences with contemporary technologies such as self-driving cars, the internet of things, big data, and robotics. This puts today's computer technology in the context of how it's being used to tackle real-world issues. LCM+L also hosts a wide range of educational programs and events in their state-of-the art classroom and lab spaces.

According to an archived version of LCM's website, their goal is "to breathe life back into our machines so the public can experience what it was like to see them, hear them, and interact with them. We make our systems accessible by allowing people to come and interact with them, and by making them available over the Internet."

The current site similarly shares that "Living Computers: Museum + Labs provides a one-of-a-kind, hands-on experience with computer technology from the 1960s to the present. LCM+L honors the history of computing with the world’s largest collection of fully restored—and usable—supercomputers, mainframes, minicomputers and microcomputers."

As of October 2022, the museum is closed due to the COVID-19 pandemic.

History

LCM+L (originally known as Living Computer Museum, and before that, PDPplanet.com) was founded by Microsoft co-founder Paul Allen, on January 9, 2006. Through PDPplanet, users were able to telnet into vintage devices and experience timesharing computing on equipment from Digital Equipment Corporation (DEC) and XKL.

Users around the world can request a login through the LCM+L website and telnet into systems from XKL, DEC, IBM, Xerox Sigma, AT&T, and CDC.

Living Computer Museum opened to the public on October 25, 2012, and guests can now visit in person to interact with the collection of mainframes, minicomputers, microcomputers and peripherals the museum has on display. Various and changing exhibits in the museum show how much computers and technology have changed over the last 50 years and are changing still.

In 2013, Seattle Weekly voted the museum the "Best Geeky Museum" because it highlights "an essential part of Seattle binary history- the founding of Microsoft and its role in establishing Seattle as a tech-driven industry".

On November 18, 2016, the institution changed its name to Living Computers: Museum + Labs to reflect its enlarged goals of igniting curiosity through direct touch experiences with contemporary technologies as well as vintage computers.

Collections and exhibits
The collection consists of publicly donated items and Paul Allen's personal collection. The working computers on display include one supercomputer, seven mainframes, 10 minicomputers, and over three dozen microcomputers.

Various artifacts from the museum have been borrowed and featured in TV shows such as Mad Men and Halt and Catch Fire.

Computers

References

Further reading 

 
 Engadget - Inside Seattle's invitation-only VR summit
 Engadget - We took a nostalgic look around Seattle's Living Computer Museum
 FC Technology - Welcome to 1986: Inside "Halt and Catch Fire's" High-Tech Time Machine
 Forbes - Bill Gates and Paul Allen Reunite and Recreate Classic 1981 Microsoft Photo
 Fox News Travel - Seattle's Living Computer Museum: not just for techies
 Geek Wire - Paul Allen's quest: A 32-bit computer built by Interdata
 Geek Wire - Go inside Paul Allen's Living Computer Museum with this 3D virtual tour
 LA Times - High-tech effort calls up smartphones for Ebola Battle
 NYT Bits - A Place where Old Computers Go to Live
 Oregon Live - Living Computer Museum offers a hands-on tour of the digital age
 Oregon Live - Paul Allen's Living Computer Museum pays homage to trailblazing PCs
 PDP-7 Lights Up the Living Computer Museum
 Seattle Times - Paul Allen's new Seattle computer museum not just for geeks
 Science Daily - Inside Seattle's Living Computer Museum
 Seattle Weekly - Best Geeky Museum: Living Computer Museum
 The Economist - Keeping skin out of the game
 The Stranger - Two Geeks and an Art Critic Visit Paul Allen's Living Computer Museum
 USA Today Video - Seattle's Living Computer Museum Tempts Tech Tourists
 WSJ Video - A Look Inside Paul Allen's Living Computer Museum

External links

 
  Pete Warden Blog: Why you should visit the Living Computer Museum in Seattle
Search the LCM+L Library and Archive Catalog!

Computer museums
Computer museums in the United States
Industry museums in Washington (state)
Museums established in 2006
Museums in Seattle
Science museums in Washington (state)
SoDo, Seattle